Phil Threshie (born April 12, 1953, Alamo, California), is a former driver in the USAC and CART Championship Car series.  He raced in the 1977-1981 seasons, with 15 combined career starts, including the 1978-1979 Indianapolis 500.  He finished in the top ten once, an 8th position in 1979 at Texas World Speedway.

Indianapolis 500 results

External links
Driver Database Profile

1953 births
American racing drivers
Living people
Indianapolis 500 drivers
People from Alamo, California
Racing drivers from California